Mani Shankar Mukherjee (commonly known as Sankar in both Bengali and English-language literature) is an Indian writer in the Bengali language, who also served as the Sheriff of Kolkata. He grew up in Howrah district of West Bengal.

Personal life
Sankar is the son of Avaya Mukherjee known as Gouri Mukherjee. Sankar's father died while he was still a teenager, as a result of which Sankar became a clerk to the last British barrister of the Calcutta High Court, Noel Frederick Barwell. At the same time he entered in Surendranath College (formerly Ripon College, Calcutta) for study. He worked in various field as typewriter cleaner, private tutor, Hawker for his living.

Literary career

After Noel Barwell's sudden death, Sankar, the professional version of his name adopted for the law courts, sought to honor Barwell. "First, I wanted to build a statue. It was not possible. I then wanted to name a road. Even that was not feasible. And then I decided to write a book about him," according to Sankar. That impetus led to his first novel, about Barwell, that according to some critics is perhaps the most stimulating -- Kato Ajanare (So Much Unknown).

Around the same time in 1962, Sankar conceived Chowringhee on a rainy day at the waterlogged crossing of Central Avenue and Dalhousie - a busy business district in the heart of Kolkata. The novel, set in the opulent hotel he called Shahjahan, was made into a cult movie in 1968. It is wrongly said that Sankar marketed his literary work to Bengali households with the marketing slogan A bagful of Sankar (Ek Bag Sankar) and collections of his books were sold in blue packets through this marketing effort. He has been rewarded with Sahitya Akademi Award on 18 March 2021 for his outstanding autobiographical work of Eka Eka Ekashi.

Works

 Jekhane Jemon (travelogue) (As It Is There)
 Kato Ajanare (novel) (The Many Unknowns) - his debut novel.
 Nivedita Research Laboratory (novel)
 Abasarika 
 Chowringhee (novel) (1962)
 Swarga Martya Patal- (collection of three stories: Jana Aranya (The Sea of People), Seemabaddha (Limited Company) and Asha Akangsha (Hopes and Desires))
 Gharer Madhye Ghar
 Nagar Nandini
 Banglar Meye 
 Simanta Sambad 
 Kamana Basana 
 Purohit Darpan
 Sri Sri Ramkrishna Rahsyamrito
 Purohit Darpan
 Mone Pare
 Mansamman (1981)
 Samrat O Sundari (novel)
 Charan Chhunye Jai 
 Bangalir Bittasadhana - Saharar Itikatha  
 Jaabar Belay 
 Mathar Opor Chhad
 Patabhumi 
 Rasabati 
 Ek Bag Sankar (collection) 
 Kamana Basana 
 Sonar Sangsar
 Chhayachhabi (collection)
 Muktir Swad
 Subarno Sujog
 ABCD
 Charan Chhunye Jai(Vol 2) 
 Bittabasana
 Eka eka ekashi
 Rup tapos

Works in translation
Translation is pending into  Italian. In 2013 the novel has been translated into French by Dr Philippe Benoit, sanskritist and head of Bengali department of Paris National Institute of Oriental Languages and Civilizations (INALCO), published by Gallimard house.
The Middleman translated by Arunava Sinha from "Jana Aranya" into English .
The Great Unknown translated by Soma Das from "Kato ajanare" into English .
Thackeray Mansion translated by Sandipan Deb from "Gharer Madhye Ghar" into English .

Screen adaptations
Many of Sankar's works have been made into films. Some notable ones are – Chowringhee, Jana Aranya and Seemabaddha, out of which the last two were directed by Satyajit Ray.
In 1959, Ritwik Ghatak started making a film Kato Ajanare based on Sankar's first novel.
 His novel, Man Samman, was turned into a film by Basu Chatterjee, Sheesha (1986), starring Mithun Chakraborty, Moonmoon Sen and Mallika Sarabhai.

Awards
1993- Bankim Puraskar for Gharer Moddhe Ghar
 Sahitya Akademi Award: 2021
 ABP Ananda Sera Bangali Award ("Sera'r Sera"): 2022

See also 
 Nrisingha Prasad Bhaduri

References

Citations

Sources
  I am happy I had a ticket to ride in the 50s: novelist Sankar Indo-Asian News Service, 22 August 2008

External links

 

Writers from Kolkata
Bengali writers
Bengali-language writers
Surendranath College alumni
University of Calcutta alumni
People from Howrah district
1933 births
Living people
Recipients of the Sahitya Akademi Award in Bengali
Sheriffs of Kolkata
People from North 24 Parganas district